Schlagerminnen is a 2009 studio album by Christer Sjögren , released on 30 September 2009, consisting of covers of 1950s and 1960s songs. It also includes the (at the time) 2009 newly written song "Ge oss år tillbaka", written by Marianne Karlsson from Kareby.

Track listing
Ge oss år tillbaka
Du och jag (Help Yourself)
Rör min själ (You Raise Me Up)
Gröna små äpplen (Little Green Apples)
När jag ser tillbaka
Hej, du glada sommar (Tie a Yellow Ribbon Round the Ole Oak Tree)
Blad faller tyst som tårar (Leaves are the Tears of Autumn)
Vandra vidare
En röd blomma till en blond flicka (Red Roses For a Blue Lady)
Han måste gå (He'll Have To Go)
Din röst får en konstig klang (The Night Has a Thousand Eyes)
Balettdansös
Den sista valsen (The Last Waltz
Dansa en dans med mig (Ten Guitars)
Tusen och en natt (Strangers in the Night)

Contributors
Christer Sjögren - vocals
Mårgan Höglund - drums
Rutger Gunnarsson - bass
Sebastian Nylund - guitar
Peter Ljung - keyboard
Lennart Sjöholm - producer

Charts

References 

2009 albums
Christer Sjögren albums